Warts and All: Volume 2 is the second volume in a collection of commercially released, full-concert live albums by the American jam band Moe. It was recorded live on February 23, 2002 at The Tabernacle in Atlanta, Georgia. This set features the first released version of "Kids", predating its release on Wormwood by five months.

This album is one of 10 "live jam releases of this century" according to the August issue of Guitar One magazine.

Track listing
All tracks by Moe except where noted.

Disc one
"Intro"* - 1:04
"Okayalright" - 5:04
"She Sends Me" - 4:54
"Spaz Medicine" - 9:58
"Understand" - 7:08
"Letter Home" - 5:34
"Timmy Tucker -> Kids jam ->" - 28:19

Disc two
"Kids" - 23:32
"Mexico ->" - 22:38
"Happy Hour Hero ->" - 14:38
"Seat of My Pants ->" - 12:03
"Sensory Deprivation Bank" - 6:06

Disc three
"Four ->" - 13:41
"Rebubula" - 20:28 Encore
"Bantor"* - 2:05
"Fire" (Jimi Hendrix) - 2:05"Spine of a Dog" -> "Buster"** - 28:12
 * "Intro" and "Bantor" are not songs, but names given to the opening/talking sections.
 ** hidden track from 2/22/02 at The Tabernacle, Atlanta, GA

Personnel

Moe
Vinnie Amico – drums
Rob Derhak – bass, vocals
Chuck Garvey – guitar, vocals, artwork
Jim Loughlin – guitar (acoustic), percussion, piccolo bass
Al Schnier – guitar, mandolin, vocals, moog synthesizer

Technical 
Chris Burrows – production coordination, stage manager
Becca Childs Derhak – art direction, photography
Fred Kevorkian – mastering
Steve Young – mixing

References

Moe (band) live albums
2002 live albums